James Howard McGrath (November 28, 1903September 2, 1966) was an American politician and attorney from Rhode Island. McGrath, a Democrat, served as U.S. Attorney for Rhode Island before becoming governor,  U.S. Solicitor General, U.S. Senator, chairman of the Democratic National Committee, and Attorney General of the United States.

Early life

Born in Woonsocket, Rhode Island. McGrath was the son of James J. McGrath and the former Ida E. May. He graduated from the La Salle Academy in 1922, attended Providence College, and went to the Boston University Law School in 1929. McGrath married Estelle A. Cadorette on November 28, 1929; they adopted a son.

From 1930 to 1934, he was the city solicitor of Central Falls, Rhode Island. During this time he was also interested in the real estate, insurance, and banking industries. He served as United States Attorney for the District of Rhode Island from 1934 to 1940.

Governor of Rhode Island
From 1941 to 1945, McGrath was Governor of Rhode Island, reorganizing the juvenile court system while sponsoring a workers' compensation fund and a labor relations board, but he resigned in the middle of his third term to accept appointment as Solicitor General of the United States (1945–1946). As governor, McGrath presided over a limited-purpose state constitutional convention in 1944.

... convention convened at the Rhode Island College of Education auditorium in Providence, March 28, 1944 for the purpose of amending the State constitution to eliminate voting registration requirements by members of the armed forces, merchant marines or persons absent from the state performing services connecting with military operations.  Delegate continent totaled 200 with Governor J. Howard McGrath serving as president & William A. Needham of Providence as Secretary.  Proposal put before the voters at a special election held April 11, 1944.  Amendment passed with 7,122 voting for & 119 against.

McGrath was elected as a Democrat to the United States Senate from Rhode Island in 1946 to join a Congress (the Eightieth, 1947 to 1949), where the opposition Republican Party had just replaced Democratic majorities in both houses. (See United States elections, 1946.)

He was briefly chairman of the U.S. Senate Committee on the District of Columbia for the 81st Congress (to which the 1948 election had returned Democratic majorities). In the Senate, McGrath opposed reducing wartime economic controls and taxes, wishing to spend the latter instead on Social Security, national health insurance, and education.

Chairman of Democratic National Committee

He was chairman of the Democratic National Committee from 1947 to 1949. In managing President Harry Truman's successful 1948 election campaign, McGrath alienated white Southerners but won over crucial black constituencies by integrating the Democratic national headquarters staff.

Attorney General
Truman appointed McGrath Attorney General of the United States on August 24, 1949. After McGrath had refused to co-operate in a corruption investigation initiated by his own department, Truman asked for and received McGrath's resignation on April 3, 1952.

Alternative accounts have contradictorily suggested that after a meeting of the Joint Chiefs of Staff at Truman's "Little White House" in Key West, the Secretary of the Navy, along with other members, had threatened to resign if they, too, were forced to comply with Special Assistant Attorney General Newbold Morris's request for the personal records of all members who might have received gifts under the scope of the corruption investigation. Under pressure to follow through with the Justice Department corruption investigation, along with the threats of resignation, McGrath agreed that Morris's request was asking too much and that the best thing to do was to clean up the department from that point forward and leave the past alone. Truman had been backed into a corner, and the only way out was to ask for McGrath's resignation. That account was corroborated by a letter from Truman to McGrath, which hung in the hallway of McGrath's summer home in Narragansett, Rhode Island up to the time of his death in 1966.

McGrath entered the private practice of law in Washington, D.C. and Providence. In 1960, he was an unsuccessful candidate to succeed the retiring U.S. Sen. Theodore Francis Green (Democrat of Rhode Island), losing the Democratic primary (also contested by former governor Dennis J. Roberts) to Claiborne Pell.

McGrath died of a heart attack in Narragansett, Rhode Island on September 2, 1966, at the age of 62. His body was buried at the St. Francis Cemetery in Pawtucket, Rhode Island.

There is a bust of Senator McGrath outside the House chamber in the Rhode Island State House.

Notes

References
"J. Howard McGrath, Ex-Attorney General, Dies." New York Times. September 3, 1966.
Levieros, Anthony. "Upsets Come Fast; Resignation of McGrath Follows Quickly His Ousting of Morris." New York Times. April 4, 1952.
Marcus, Maeva. Truman and the Steel Seizure Case: The Limits of Presidential Power. New York: Columbia University Press, 1977. 
 West's Encycylopedia of American Law  provides more details than the other sources, especially about McGrath's early life, his commitment to civil rights and the financial scandals that touched him.

External links

Biographical Directory of the United States Congress
National Governors Association

|-

|-

|-

|-

|-

|-

|-

1903 births
1966 deaths
20th-century American lawyers
20th-century American politicians
Boston University School of Law alumni
Providence College alumni
Democratic National Committee chairs
Democratic Party governors of Rhode Island
Politicians from Woonsocket, Rhode Island
Rhode Island lawyers
United States Solicitors General
United States Attorneys General
United States Attorneys for the District of Rhode Island
La Salle Academy alumni
Democratic Party United States senators from Rhode Island
Truman administration cabinet members
Burials in Rhode Island
Catholics from Rhode Island